Coco Lin Yik-hei (born 19 February 1995) is an épée fencer from Hong Kong. She competed in the 2020 Summer Olympics.

References

1995 births
Living people
Fencers at the 2020 Summer Olympics
Hong Kong female épée fencers
Olympic fencers of Hong Kong
Asian Games medalists in fencing
Fencers at the 2014 Asian Games
Fencers at the 2018 Asian Games
Asian Games bronze medalists for Hong Kong
Medalists at the 2014 Asian Games
Medalists at the 2018 Asian Games
20th-century Hong Kong women
21st-century Hong Kong women